Paraoxypilus is a genus of mantis, known as the boxer bark mantises. They are native to Australia and Oceania.

Description
This genus gets its name from the unusual way it acts like and resembles a boxer. Boxer bark mantises are black with hints of grey and white. They can mimic an ant due to its small size and its ant-like abdomen and small bumpy thorax. It does this to avoid predators and is excellent at camouflage.

The insects reach 2–3 cm (about 1") long as adults, while small nymphs are only 3 mm (about ⅛").

Although some mantises are kept as pets, this genus of mantis is generally not, due to the difficulties presented by its small size.

See also
List of Australian stick insects and mantids
Mantodea of Oceania

References

Nanomantidae
Mantodea genera
Mantodea of Oceania
Insects of Australia
Taxa named by Henri Louis Frédéric de Saussure